Kerr's sign is a dermatological sign characterized by a palpable change in skin texture inferior to the somatic level of a spinal cord lesion. The skin may feel stiff, dry, or tense.

References

Dermatologic signs
Medical signs